Ayatsuri (Dargwa: ГӀяяцӀуримахьи) is a rural locality (a selo) in Urarinsky Selsoviet, Dakhadayevsky District, Republic of Dagestan, Russia. The population was 150 as of 2010.

Geography 
Ayatsuri is located 41 km southwest of Urkarakh (the district's administrative centre) by road. Butulta and Mukranari are the nearest rural localities.

Nationalities 
Dargins live there.

References 

Rural localities in Dakhadayevsky District